Lloyd Jeffrey Isgrove (born 12 January 1993) is a professional footballer who plays for Bolton Wanderers. Isgrove plays primarily as a winger, but he is also comfortable playing in other midfield positions and as a forward. He has one cap for Wales.

Club career

Southampton
Isgrove was a member of Southampton's academy system; his first inclusion in the Southampton's first team came on 30 October 2012 in the fourth round of the 2012–13 League Cup against Leeds United, for which he was included on the bench. The midfielder came on as a substitute for winger Steve De Ridder in the 66th minute, seeing out the remainder of the 3–0 defeat. He made his first start for the club the following August in a 5–1 victory against Barnsley in the League Cup second round, setting up the opening goal.

Isgrove made his league debut for Southampton in the first game of the 2014–15 season, playing the last 8 minutes of a 2–1 loss at Liverpool in place of Steven Davis.

On 17 March 2015, Southampton confirmed that Isgrove had signed a two-year contract extension until 2017. He was released by Southampton at the end of the 2016–17 season.

Peterborough United (loan)
On 13 March 2014, Isgrove joined League One club Peterborough United on a one-month loan, subsequently extended to the end of the season.

Isgrove also played in the 2014 Football League Trophy Final, which Peterborough won 3–1 against Chesterfield on 30 March 2014 at Wembley Stadium. Isgrove returned to Southampton after his loan with Peterborough ended.

Sheffield Wednesday (loan)
On 18 March 2015, Isgrove signed an emergency loan deal with Sheffield Wednesday until the end of the season. Isgrove made eight appearances for Sheffield Wednesday, before he returned to Southampton.

Barnsley (loan)
On 24 October 2015, Isgrove completed a loan move to League One club Barnsley where he stayed until the end of the season. He helped Barnsley win the Football League Trophy, beating Oxford United of League Two 3–2 in the final at Wembley.

Isgrove returned to Wembley for the play-off final in May. He scored his first goal for the club after 74 minutes as Barnsley beat Millwall 3–1 to gain promotion to the Championship. He returned to Southampton at the end of the season, when his loan ended.

Barnsley
After Southampton released Isgrove at the end of the 2016–17 season, he signed a three-year contract with Championship club Barnsley.

On 30 January 2019, Isgrove signed for League One Portsmouth on a loan deal until the end of the 2018–19 season

He was released by Barnsley at the end of the 2018–19 season.

Swindon Town
On 30 July 2019, Isgrove joined League Two side Swindon Town on a one-year deal following a successful trial.

Bolton Wanderers
On 26 September 2020, Isgrove signed for newly relegated League Two side Bolton Wanderers on a one-year contract, joining former Swindon Teammate Eoin Doyle. He made his debut the same day, coming on as a 65th minute substitute for Jak Hickman in a 0–2 home defeat against Newport County. On 5 December 2020 he scored his first Bolton goal when he scored Bolton's third goal in a 3–6 defeat against Port Vale. On 26 May 2021, he signed a new two-year contract. During the 2021–22 season, due to injury to Gethin Jones and poor form by Harry Brockbank, Isgrove played multiple matches as a right-back. He was injured in November 2021, and after returning to fitness in March 2022 he was injured playing for the reserves and missed the rest of the season.

International career
In January 2013 Isgrove was selected for the Wales under-21 squad and made his debut in a 3–0 win against Iceland in a friendly match on 6 February 2013.  Injuries saw Isgrove called up to the Welsh senior squad in October 2013, he remained on the bench in a 1–1 draw with Belgium.

He made his senior international debut on 24 March 2016 as a 62nd-minute substitute in a friendly against Northern Ireland, helping Wales to a 1–1 draw.

Career statistics

Notes

Honours
Peterborough United
Football League Trophy: 2013–14

Barnsley
Football League Trophy: 2015–16
Football League One play-offs: 2016

Swindon Town
EFL League Two: 2019–20

Bolton Wanderers
EFL League Two third-place (promotion): 2020–21

References

External links

1993 births
Living people
People from Yeovil
English footballers
Welsh footballers
Wales international footballers
Wales under-21 international footballers
Association football midfielders
Southampton F.C. players
Peterborough United F.C. players
Sheffield Wednesday F.C. players
Barnsley F.C. players
Portsmouth F.C. players
Swindon Town F.C. players
Bolton Wanderers F.C. players
English Football League players
Premier League players
English people of Welsh descent